Sean Patrick Maguire (born 1 May 1994) is a professional footballer who plays as a striker for Championship club Coventry City.

Club career

Waterford United
Maguire started his career at Waterford United, making his debut in July 2011 against Mervue United. During his career at Waterford  he scored 14 goals in 32 games. Waterford's chairman, John O'Sullivan said of Maguire, "I'm a great fan of Lionel Messi at Barcelona. When I look at Seanie, he really reminds me of him." Maguire finished as top scorer in the 2012 League of Ireland First Division.

West Ham United
In January 2013 he signed for West Ham United on a two and a half year contract. In January 2014 he was an unused substitute in West Ham's 5–0 FA Cup defeat by Nottingham Forest. He was released by West Ham at the end of the 2014–15 season.

Sligo Rovers loan
In February 2014 he signed on loan for Sligo Rovers. Maguire made his debut for Sligo on 24 February in a 4–1 away win in the Setanta Cup against Crusaders. His only goal for the club came on 27 July in a 2–0 home win against Limerick The loan period which lasted until August 2014 and included two Europa League qualifying games against Rosenborg.

Accrington Stanley loan
In September 2014, he joined Accrington Stanley on loan, making his football league debut against Northampton Town on 20 September, scoring his first goal and Accrington's fifth in a 5–4 victory. In December 2014, Maguire returned to West Ham at the end of the loan. He had scored four goals in 13 games. On 24 December, although his return to West Ham had been announced, Accrington extended his loan until 18 January 2015.

Cork City
After half a season at Dundalk, where he won a Leinster Senior Cup medal but didn't make the matchday squad for the FAI Cup Final, Maguire signed for Cork City on 9 December 2015. On 27 February Maguire scored in his first competitive game for City, in the 2016 President's Cup final against former club Dundalk. A week later, Maguire scored twice in a 2–0 win over Bohemians on his league debut for Cork. He finished the season as the league's top scorer with 18 goals, and he also scored the late winner as Cork beat Dundalk 1–0 in the FAI Cup. On 3 June 2017 it was reported that Maguire had agreed a transfer to Preston North End by the end of July 2017.
On 6 July 2017, Maguire scored a hat-trick against Levadia Tallinn in the second leg of their first qualifying round of the 2017–18 UEFA Europa League at Turners Cross to become Cork City's leading goalscorer in European competition.

Preston North End
On 3 June 2017, Cork and Preston agreed a deal for Maguire to join Preston at the end of July. He signed a three-year deal with the club, with Cork City describing the fee as "an appropriate but undisclosed compensation package." Maguire made his competitive debut for Preston on the opening day of the Championship season, playing 74 minutes before being substituted, against Sheffield Wednesday. His first competitive goal for Preston came  against Barnsley on 9 September. Maguire returned from a hamstring injury in March to score two goals off the bench as Preston beat Bolton Wanderers 3–1 on 3 March. He continued his comeback from injury with another goal from the bench against Bristol City as he netted the winner in a 2–1 win at Deepdale Stadium.

Coventry City

On 26 January 2023, with his North End contract set to expire at the end of the season, Maguire left Deepdale to sign for fellow Championship club Coventry City on a permanent deal until the end of the season.

International career
Despite being born in Luton, making him eligible to play either for England or the Republic of Ireland, Maguire opted to play for Ireland, having grown up in Kilkenny, where his parents returned when he was a couple of months old.

Youth
On 25 March 2015, Maguire was called up for Ireland's under-21 team for a match against Andorra under-21 team in Wexford on 26 March 2015. Ireland won the game, 1–0 with Maguire making his debut as a substitute.

Senior
Maguire was named in Ireland's preliminary 39-man squad for the World Cup qualifiers against Georgia and Serbia in August 2017, however he was cut from the final squad. He was again named in Ireland's preliminary squad for the final two qualifiers against Moldova and Wales, this time making the final squad. Maguire made his debut for Ireland against Moldova in October 2017, coming on for Shane Long towards the end of the match.
Maguire scored his first goal for Ireland on 14 November 2019, in a 3–1 win against New Zealand.

Career statistics

Club

International

Scores and results list the Republic of Ireland's goal tally first

Honours
Sligo Rovers
 Setanta Cup: 2014

Dundalk
 League of Ireland Premier Division: 2015
 FAI Cup: 2015
 Leinster Senior Cup: 2015

Cork City
 League of Ireland Premier Division: 2017
 FAI President's Cup: 2016, 2017
FAI Cup: 2016
Munster Senior Cup: 2017

Individual
 PFAI Young Player of the Year: 2016
 PFAI Premier Division Team of the Year: 2016
 League of Ireland Premier Division Player of the Month: March 2017

See also
 List of Republic of Ireland international footballers born outside the Republic of Ireland

References

External links

1994 births
Living people
Footballers from Luton
English footballers
Republic of Ireland association footballers
Association football forwards
Waterford F.C. players
West Ham United F.C. players
Sligo Rovers F.C. players
Accrington Stanley F.C. players
Dundalk F.C. players
Cork City F.C. players
Preston North End F.C. players
Coventry City F.C. players
League of Ireland players
English Football League players
Republic of Ireland youth international footballers
Republic of Ireland under-21 international footballers
Republic of Ireland international footballers
English people of Irish descent